9 is the fifth studio album by Japanese visual kei rock band Alice Nine. The album was officially released on February 22, 2012.

9 was released in two formats: a limited edition with an exclusive DVD and a regular edition. The DVD included with the limited edition of the album features a music video for "すべてへ", as well as a multi-angle version of the music video focusing on one of the five members of the band and a making-of documentary for the music video. The album was preceded by three singles: "Blue Flame", released in August 2011, and "Heart of Gold", released in September 2011 and finally Niji no Yuki on 21 December 2011.

After the release, the band embarked on four tours of Japan entitled Alice Nine "Court of '9'" #1-4. So far they have completed the first two of these tours with relative success in all areas of Japan, managing to sell out in many medium-to-large venues nationwide.

Track listing
All lyrics written by Shou. A majority of the tracks were joint-produced by Alice Nine and Hajime Okano, except for Blue Flame and Heart of Gold (Produced by Alice Nine) and  Niji no Yuki which was produced by Takamichi Tsugei.

 Standard edition

Personnel
 Shou – vocals
 Hiroto – electric guitar, acoustic guitar
 Tora – electric guitar, acoustic guitar
 Saga – bass guitar, electric guitar, backing vocals, synthesizer, programming
 Nao – drums
 Atsushi Koike – Keyboards & Keyboards Arrangement
 Sin – Recording Director
 Hitoshi Hiruma – Mix Engineer
 Yasuyuki Hara – Mix Engineer, Recording Engineer
 Keiji Kondo – Recording Engineer
 Masahiro Tamoto – Recording Engineer
 Keita Joko – Recording Engineer
 Masahiro Abo – Recording Engineer
 Tucky – Mastering Engineer (Mastering Studio) – parasight mastering
 Koji Yoda (ROKUSHIKI) – Art Direction
 Mayumi Hoshino (ROKUSHIKI) – Design
 Susumu Miyawaki (PROGRESS-M) – Photography
 Masato Hishinuma (DEEP-END) – Styling & Costume
 Kaolu Asanuma (DEEP_END) – Hair & Make-up
 Fumie Nozawa – Hair & Make-up
 Kiyoe Minazawa (TOKUMA JAN COMMUNICATIONS) – Artwork Co-ordination
 Tomomi Ozaki (PS-Company Co. Ltd.) – Executive Producer
 Masahiro Shinoki – Executive Producer
 Hirose Shiraishi (TOKUMA JAPAN COMMUNICATIONS) – Executive Producer

Reception
9 peaked at number 12 on the Oricon Weekly Albums Chart and stayed on the charts for three weeks. Successful, but their lowest album ranking since their first in 2006 and considerably lower than the previous album, 2011's Gemini.

References

External links
 Official PS-Company 9 Album Company website
 Official Tokuma Japan Communications website

2012 albums
Alice Nine albums